Nauman Zafar (born 31 January 1995) is a Canadian cricketer. In October 2019, he was named in Canada's squad for the 2019–20 Regional Super50 tournament in the West Indies. He made his List A debut on 11 November 2019, for Canada against Barbados, in the Regional Super50 tournament.

References

External links
 

1995 births
Living people
Canadian cricketers
Place of birth missing (living people)